The Vegas Valley leopard frog (Lithobates fisheri), also known as the Las Vegas leopard frog, is an extinct species of frog. It was believed to be the only frog endemic to the United States to have become extinct in modern times.

History
A. Vanderhorst collected 10 specimens of this species at Tule Springs on January 13, 1942. These frogs were believed to be the last recorded specimens of the Vegas Valley leopard frog, and are now in the University of Michigan Museum of Comparative Zoology collection. The Vegas Valley leopard frog was considered extinct after extensive searches have failed to locate the species.

Taxonomy
In 2011, a genetic analysis using DNA from preserved museum specimens of the Vegas Valley leopard frog revealed it is 100% identical genetically to the northwestern Mogollon Rim populations of the Chiricahua leopard frog (Lithobates chiricahuensis), which is extant but threatened. While it has been extirpated from the Las Vegas area, the frog is no longer considered extinct because it is the same species as the Chiricahua leopard frog. According to nomenclatural priority, the northwestern Mogollon Rim population of L. chiricahuensis, described in 1979, is referable to the 1893-described, extinct population of the species, L. fisheri. L. chiricahuensis may remain a valid taxon for the southern and eastern range of the Chiricahua leopard frog. Though what many may assume is that just because an identical species of the Vegas Valley leopard frog was discovered, many may not know that the Chiricahuensis Leopard Frog is actually endangered and listed under the federal threatened page. 

Apparently, two separate species are within the L. fisheri/L. chiricahuensis complex - L. fisheri, comprising the former Vegas Valley leopard frogs near Las Vegas and the Chiricahua leopard frogs from the Mogollon Rim, and L. chiricahuensis, comprising the Chiricahua leopard frogs from the southern and eastern portions of the range in Arizona and New Mexico. The status of the Chiricahua leopard frog in northern Mexico may be uncertain, and this may be yet another separate lineage. The L. fisheri/L. chiricahuensis complex has a close relationship with an unnamed leopard frog species called only "Lithobates species 2" known from San Luis Potosí, Mexico.

References

Further reading

Hillis, D.M., Frost, J.S., & Wright, D.A. (1983). Phylogeny and biogeography of the Rana pipiens complex: A biochemical evaluation. Systematic Zoology' 32: 132–143.
Hillis, D.M. (1988). Systematics of the Rana pipiens complex: Puzzle and paradigm. Annual Review of Systematics and Ecology 19: 39–63.
Hillis, D.M. & Wilcox, T.P. (2005). Phylogeny of the New World true frogs (Rana). Mol. Phylogenet. Evol. 34(2): 299–314.  PDF fulltext.
Hillis, D. M. (2007). Constraints in naming parts of the Tree of Life. Mol. Phylogenet. Evol.'' 42: 331–338.

Amphibians of the United States
Lithobates
Amphibians described in 1893
Endemic fauna of the United States
Extinct amphibians
Amphibians of North America
Taxa named by Leonhard Stejneger